The 2017 Leicestershire County Council election took place on 4 May 2017 as part of the 2017 local elections in the United Kingdom. All councillors were elected from electoral divisions by first-past-the-post voting for a four-year term of office.

The Local Government Boundary Commission for England has undertaken a review of the county and has recommended a change to the boundaries of the electoral divisions. These changes took effect at this election. Leicestershire's 55 county councillors will represent 51 single-member electoral divisions and two two-member electoral divisions: Glenfields, Kirby Muxloe & Leicester Forests, and Oadby.

Results

There are 55 seats on the county council. The Conservatives and Labour fielded 55 candidates with the Liberal Democrats fielding 53, the UK Independence Party fielding 43 and the Green Party fielding 18.

Overview

|}

Results by electoral division
Results for individual divisions are shown below. They have been divided into their respective districts or boroughs and listed alphabetically.

District of Blaby
(8 seats, 7 Electoral Divisions)

District of Charnwood

District of Harborough

District of Hinckley and Bosworth

District of Melton

North West Leicestershire

District of Oadby and Wigston

References

External links
Leicestershire County Council: Elections 2017

2017
2017 English local elections
2010s in Leicestershire